The Sitka School District (or SSD) provides for the educational needs of citizens of Sitka, Alaska. The district's offices are located in Keet Gooshi Heen Elementary School.

The Sitka School District's enrollment usually hovers between 1,400 and 1,500 students in its k-12 enrollment figure.

A common misconception especially among those outside of Sitka is that the statewide public boarding high school, Mt. Edgecumbe High School, is part of the district when in fact it is administered directly by the State of Alaska.

List of Sitka School District schools

 Baranof Elementary School
 Blatchley Middle School
 Keet Gooshi Heen Elementary School (formerly Verstovia Elementary)
 Pacific High School (Sitka) (the local alternative high school)
 Sitka High School (the primary local high school)

See also
 List of school districts in Alaska

External links
 

School districts in Alaska
Education in Sitka, Alaska